This is a list of works by Scottish author Alan Grant.

Novels 
Novels include
 Batman: The Stone King (2001)
 DC Universe: Last Sons (2006 – featuring Superman, Martian Manhunter and Lobo)

Comics

2000 AD 
Writing in 2000 AD include:

Tharg's Future Shocks:
 "A Close Encounter of the Fatal Kind!" (with Carlos Ezquerra, in 2000 AD #102, 1979)
 "Nigel Goes a Hunting" (with Jesus Redondo, in 2000 AD #259, 1982)
 "Alec Trench, Zombie" (with Ron Smith, in 2000 AD #263–264, 1982)
 "Sid" (with Brett Ewins, in 2000 AD #286, 1982)
 "The War Game" (with Jim Eldridge, in 2000 AD #287, 1982)
 Blackhawk (in 2000 AD #127-28 & 130–161, 1979–80 & 2000 AD 1982 Sci-Fi Special, 1982)
 Judge Dredd:
 "The Judge Child" (with co-author John Wagner and art by Brian Bolland (1, 7, 17–18), Ron Smith (2–4, 9–10, 12–14, 19–20, 24–26) and Mike McMahon (5–6, 8, 11, 15–16, 21–23), in 2000 AD #156–181, 1980)
 "Block War" (with co-author John Wagner and art by Brian Bolland, in 2000 AD #182, 1980)
 Judge Dredd (in 2000 AD #183–267, 269–499, 1980–1985)
 "Judge Death Lives" (with co-author John Wagner and art by Brian Bolland, in 2000 AD #224–228, 1981)
 "The Apocalypse War" (with co-author John Wagner and art by Carlos Ezquerra, in 2000 AD #245–270, 1982)
 "The Graveyard Shift" (with co-author John Wagner and art by Ron Smith, in 2000 AD #335–341, 1983)
 "City of the Damned" (with co-author John Wagner and art by Steve Dillon (1, 5–7, 12–13), Ron Smith (2–3, 10, 14), Kim Raymond (4, 11) and Ian Gibson (8–9), in 2000 AD #393–406, 1984)
 Judge Dredd (in 2000 AD # 451–502, 1986)
 "Tomb of the Judges" (with co-author John Wagner and art by Ian Gibson, in 2000 AD #496–498, 1986)
 Judge Dredd (in 2000 AD # 503–554, 1987)
 Judge Dredd (in 2000 AD # 555–574 & 577, 1988)
 Judge Dredd (in 2000 AD # 587, 598, 600–602 & 607, 1988)
 "A Total Near Death Experience" (by Alan Grant, with art by Barry Kitson, in 2000 AD #629–630, 1989)
 Judge Dredd (in Judge Dredd Megazine vol.1 #1–6, 10–20, 1990–92)
 Judge Dredd (in Judge Dredd Megazine vol.2 #19–20, 1993)
 "Magic Moments" (with David Roach, in 20000 AD #1567, 2008)
 "Gorilla/z" (with Mike Collins, in 20000 AD #1568, 2008)
 Tharg the Mighty (in 2000 AD #162, Sci-Fi Special & 176-77, 1980)
 Strontium Dog:
 "Death's Head" (with Carlos Ezquerra, in 2000 AD #171–178, 1980)
 "Bitch" (with Carlos Ezquerra, in 2000 AD #505–529, 1987)
 "The Stone Killers" (with Carlos Ezquerra, in 2000 AD #560–572, 1988)
Ace Trucking Co. (with co-author John Wagner and art by Massimo Belardinelli, unless noted):
 The Complete Ace Trucking Co. Volume 1 (320 pages ) collects:
 "The Kleggs" (in 2000 AD #232–236, 1981)
 "Hell's Pocket" (with art by Ian Gibson, in 2000 AD #239–243, 1981)
 "Lugjack" (in 2000 AD #244–250, 1982)
 "The Great Mush Rush" (in 2000 AD #251–258, 1982)
 "The Ughbug Bloos" (in 2000 AD #259, 1982)
 "Last Lug To Abbo Dabbo" (in 2000 AD #260–267, 1982)
 "Joobaloo" (in 2000 AD #268–272, 1982)
 "Too Many Bams" (in 2000 AD #273–278, 1982)
 "The Kloistar Run" (in 2000 AD #279–285, 1982)
 "Stoop Coop Soup" (in 2000 AD #288–293, 1982)
 The Complete Ace Trucking Co. Volume 2 (336 pages ) collects:
 "Bamfeezled" (2000AD Sci-Fi Special 1982)
 "On The Dangle" (in 2000 AD #378–386, 1984)
 "Strike!" (in 2000 AD #387–390 and 392–400, 1984–1985)
 "The Croakside Trip" (in 2000 AD #428–433, 1985)
 "Stowaway Lugjacker" (in 2000 AD Annual 1986, 1985)
 "Whatever Happened to Ace Garp?" (in 2000 AD #451, 1986)
 "The Doppelgarp" (in 2000 AD #452–472, 1986)
 "The Garpetbaggers" (in 2000 AD #475–483 and 485–498, 1986)
 "The Homecoming" (in 2000 AD Annual 1989, 1988)
 Robo-Hunter:
 Robo-Hunter (in 2000 AD #259–272, 275–281 & 283–288, 292–307, 312–334 & 1984 2000 AD Annual 1982–1983)
 Robo-Hunter (in 2000 AD prog 2004 & #1371–1373, 2003–2004)
 Robo-Hunter (in 2000 AD #1406–1411, 2004)
 Robo-Hunter (in 2000 AD prog 2005, 2004)
 "Stim!" (in 2000 AD #1450-, 2005)
 Harry Twenty on the High Rock (uncredited co-writer) (in 2000 AD # 287–307, 1982–1983)
Time Twisters:
 "Nigel Goes a Hunting" (with Eric Bradbury, in 2000 AD #294, 1982)
 "Dr Dale's Diary" (with Boluda, in 2000 AD #302, 1983)
 "Rogan's Run" (with Massimo Belardinelli, in 2000 AD #307, 1983)
 "The Avenging Kong Meets Laurel and Hardy" (with Mike White, in 2000 AD #313, 1983)
 "TCSpudd's First Case" (with Jim Eldridge, in 2000 AD #316, 1983)
 "I Could Do That" (with Mike White, in 2000 AD #321, 1983)
 "Que Sera, Sera" (with Robin Smith, in 2000 AD #346, 1983)
 "Jogging" (with Geoff Senior, in 2000 AD #348, 1983)
 Anderson: Psi Division:
 "The Haunting" (with art by Kim Raymond, 2000 AD Annual 1984, 1983)
 "The Mind of Edward Bottlebum" (with co-author John Wagner and art by Ian Gibson, Judge Dredd Annual 1985, 1984)
 Judge Anderson (with co-author, John Wagner, May 2005, 192 pages, Rebellion):
 "Four Dark Judges" (with art by Brett Ewins (1–7), Cliff Robinson (8–10, 12) and Robin Smith (11), in 2000 AD  #416–427, 1985)
 "The Possessed" (as R. Clark, with art by Brett Ewins, in 2000 AD #468–478, 1986)
 "Hour of the Wolf" (with art by Barry Kitson and Will Simpson, in 2000 AD #520–531, 1987)
 "A Fistful of Denimite" (with art by Ian Gibson, in Judge Dredd Annual 1986, 1985)
 "Golem" (with art by Enric Romero, in 2000 AD Annual 1987, 1986)
 "A Soldier's Tale" (with art by Mike Collins, in Judge Dredd Annual 1988, 1987)
 "Colin Wilson Block" (with art by Ian Gibson, in 2000 AD Winter Special 1988)
 "Contact" (with art by Mark Farmer, in 2000 AD #607–609, 1988–1989)
 "Beyond the Void" (with art by Mick Austin, in 2000 AD #612–613, 1989)
 "Helios" (with art by David Roach, in 2000 AD #614–622, 1989)
 "Triad" (with art by Arthur Ranson, in 2000 AD #635–644, 1989)
 "The Prophet" (with art by David Roach, in 2000 AD #645–647, 1989)
 "The Random Man" (with art by Carlos Ezquerra, in 2000 AD #657–659, 1989)
 "Judge Corey – Leviathan's Farewell" (with art by Mick Austin, in 2000 AD Sci-Fi Special 1989)
 "Confessions of a She-Devil" (with artist Mick Austin, 2000 AD Annual 1990, 1989)
 "The Screaming Skull" (with art by David Roach, in 2000 AD #669–670, 1990)
 Shamballa (June 2008, 224 pages, Rebellion):
 "Shamballa" (with art by Arthur Ranson, in 2000 AD #700–711, 1990)
 "Reasons to Be Cheerful" (with art by Arthur Ranson (1) and Siku (2), in Judge Dredd Megazine (vol. 2) #10–11, 1992)
 "The Witch? Report" (with art by Arthur Ranson, in Judge Dredd Megazine (vol. 2) #14, 1992)
 "Jesus Syndrome" (with art by Arthur Ranson, in Judge Dredd Megazine (vol. 2) #22–24, 1993)
 "Satan" (with art by Arthur Ranson, in Judge Dredd Megazine (vol. 3) #1–7, 1995)
 "The Protest" (with art by Arthur Ranson, in Judge Dredd Megazine (vol. 3) #14, 1996)
 "R*Evolution" (with art by Arthur Ranson, in 2000 AD #1263–1272, 2001)
 "Engram" (with art and co-plotting by David Roach, in 2000 AD #712–717, #758–763, 1991)
 "Blythe Spirit" (with art by David Roach, in Judge Dredd Megazine (vol. 2) #8, 1992)
 "Baby Talk" (with co-author Tony Luke and art by Russel Fox, in Judge Dredd Mega Special 1992)
 "George" (with art by Russell Fox, in Judge Dredd Yearbook 1993, 1992)
 "Childhood's end" (with art by Kev Walker, in Judge Dredd Megazine (vol. 2) #27–34, 1993)
 "Voyage of the seeker" (with art by Mark Wilkinson, in Judge Dredd Megazine (vol. 2) #37, 1993)
 "Postcards from the Edge" (with art by Steve Sampson (1, 10–11), Tony Luke (2, 8), Charles Gillespie (3, 9), Arthur Ranson (4), Xuasus (5–7), in Judge Dredd Megazine (vol. 2) #50–60, 1994)
 "Postcard to Myself" (with art by Steve Sampson, in Judge Dredd Megazine (vol. 2) #73, 1995)
 "Something Wicked" (with art by Steve Sampson (1–3) and Charles Gillespie (4–7), in Judge Dredd Megazine (vol. 2) #74–80, 1995)
 "Half-Life" (with co-author Tony Luke, and art by Arthur Ranson, in Judge Dredd Megazine #214–217, 1996)
 "Wonderwall" (with art by Steve Sampson, in 2000 AD #1045–1049, 1997)
 "Crusade" (with art by Steve Sampson, in 2000 AD #1050–1061, 1997)
 "Danse Macabre" (with art by Angel Unzueta, in 2000 AD #1076, 1998)
 "Witch" (with art by Steve Sampson, in 2000 AD #1087–1089, 1998)
 "The Great Debate" (with art by Steve Sampson, in 2000 AD #1090, 1998)
 "Lawless" (with art by Trevor Hairsine, in 2000 AD #1102–1103, 1998)
 "Horror Story" (with art by Steve Sampson, in 2000 AD #1132–1137, 1999)
 "Semper Vi" (with art by Steve Sampson, in 2000 AD #1140, 1999)
 "R*Evolution" (with art by Arthur Ranson, in 2000 AD #1263–1272, 2001)
 "WMD" (with art by Arthur Ranson, in Judge Dredd Megazine #221–226, 2004)
 "Lock-in" (with art by Arthur Ranson, in Judge Dredd Megazine #227–230, 2005)
 "City Of Dead" (with art by Arthur Ranson, in Judge Dredd Megazine #231–236, 2005)
 "Lucid" (with art by Arthur Ranson, in Judge Dredd Megazine #238–241, 2005)
 "Big Robots" (with art by Dave Taylor, in Judge Dredd Megazine #257–261, 2007)
 "Wiierd" (with Boo Cook, in Judge Dredd Megazine #272–276, 2008)
 "Biophyle" (with Boo Cook, in Judge Dredd Megazine #277–278, 2008)
 The Helltrekkers (with José Ortiz, in 2000 AD # 387–415, 1984–1985)
 Mean Team (in 2000 AD # 437–447, 1985)
 Mazeworld (with Arthur Ranson):
 "Book I" (in 2000 AD #1014–1023, 1996)
 "Book II" (in 2000 AD #1101–1110, 1998)
 "Book III" (in 2000 AD #1151–1160, 1999)
 Bad City Blue (in 2000 AD # 468–477, 1986)
 Tales from Mega-City One:
 Tales from Mega-City One (in 2000 AD # 523, 525–26, 532–34 & 539, 1987)
 Tales from Mega-City One (in 2000 AD # 605, 1988)
 Tales from the Doghouse (in 2000 AD # 578-79, 1988)
 Judge Hershey (in Judge Dredd Mega-Special # 2, 1989)
 Durham Red (with Carlos Ezquerra):
 "Island of the Damned" (in 2000 AD #762–773, 1991)
 "The Golden Mile" (in 2000AD Yearbook 1993)
 Middenface McNulty: "Wan Man an' His Dug" (co-author Tony Luke and artist John McCrea, in Judge Dredd Megazine vol.1 #15–20, 1991–1992)
 Armageddon: The Bad Man (in Judge Dredd Megazine vol.2 #1–7, 1992)
 BLAIR One (with art from Simon Davis):
 "Blair Force One" (in 2000 AD #1071–1074, 1997)
 "Criminal Record" (in 2000 AD #1084, 1998)
 "He Died with his Boots on" (in 2000 AD #1097–1098, 1998)
 Young Middenface:
 "Grannibal!" (with pencils by Patrick Goddard and inks Dylan Teague, in Judge Dredd Megazine #3.76, 2001)
 "Tambo Shanter" (with pencils by Patrick Goddard, inks Dylan Teague and colours by Richard Elson, in Judge Dredd Megazine #4.11, 2002)
 "A Parcel of Rogues" (with pencils by Patrick Goddard, inks Dylan Teague, in Judge Dredd Megazine #4.16–4.18, 2002)
 "Mutopia" (with John Ridgway, in Judge Dredd Megazine #205–207, 2003)
 "Brigadoom!" (with pencils by Patrick Goddard, inks Dylan Teague, in Judge Dredd Megazine #218–220, 2004)
 "Killoden" (with John Ridgway, in Judge Dredd Megazine #224–229, 2004–2005)
 "Midnapped!" (with Shaun Thomas, in Judge Dredd Megazine #234–236, 2005)
 "A Scottish Sojer" (with Shaun Thomas, in Judge Dredd Megazine #240–243, 2006)
 Juliet November (in Judge Dredd Megazine #202–204, 2003)
 Apocalypse Soon (in Judge Dredd Megazine #204–214, 2003–2004)
 The Bogie Man: "Return to Casablanca" (in Judge Dredd Megazine #227–233, 2005)
 Whatever Happened to?: "Melda Dreepe" (in Judge Dredd Megazine #230, 2005)

Eagle 
 Doomlord (in Eagle # 1–13, 20 – 40, 49 – 67, 79 – 93 and continuing, 1982–83)
 Joe Soap (in Eagle # 12–22, 41–45, 1982)
 Manix (in Eagle # 24–31, 41 – 64, 68–77, 79 to 93 and continuing, 1982–84)
 The House of Daemon (in Eagle # 25–47, 1982–83)
 Gil Hazzard – Codename Scorpio (in Eagle # 49–67, 1983)
 Computer Warrior (1985–1988)

DC Comics 
 Outcasts (with co-author John Wagner, and pencils by Cam Kennedy, 12-issue limited series, DC Comics, 1987–1988)
 Detective Comics #583-597, 601-621, 627, 641-642 (with co-author John Wagner, 1988–1992)
 Batman vs. Judge Dredd: Judgement on Gotham (1991)
 Batman #448-449, 455-466, 470-471, 474-476, 479-480 (24 issues, DC Comics)
 Batman: Shadow of the Bat #0-82 (82 issues, DC Comics, 1992–97) collected as:
 Batman: The Last Arkham (collects Shadow of the Bat #1–4, 1992, tpb, 1996)
 Lobo #0-64 (65 issues, DC Comics)
 The Demon
 L.E.G.I.O.N. #1-39, 50-51 (41 issues, DC Comics)
 Batman / Judge Dredd: Vendetta in Gotham (DC / Fleetway, 1993)
 Bob, the Galactic Bum (with co-author John Wagner and art by Carlos Ezquerra, 4-issue mini-series, DC, 1995)
 Batman / Judge Dredd: The Ultimate Riddle (DC / Fleetway, 1995)
 Catwoman (vol.1 #26, 1995)
 Tank Girl: Apocalypse (#1–4, Vertigo, 1995–1996)
 Batman/Phantom Stranger (with Arthur Ranson, one-shot, DC Comics, 1997)
 Anarky (vol.1) (#1–4, 1997)
 Batman / Judge Dredd: Die Laughing (1998)
 Batman: Anarky (1999)
 Anarky (vol.2) (#1–8, 1999)
 Batman: Dreamland (DC, 2000)
 Superman vs. The Terminator: Death to the Future (with pencils by Steve Pugh and inks by Mike Perkins, 4-issue mini-series, DC Comics and Dark Horse Comics, 2000)
 Batman / Scarface (DC, 2001)
 "The Bat no More...?" (with Enrique Breccia, in Batman: Gotham Knights #16, 2001, collected in Batman: Black & White Volume 2)
 JLA: Riddle of the Beast (with various artists: Carl Critchlow, Simon Davis, Glenn Fabry, Jon Foster, Rafael Garres, Doug Alexander Gregory, Michael William Kaluta, Hermann Mejia, Jim Murray, Alessandro Orlandelli, Andrew Robinson, Liam Sharp, Greg Staples, Saverio Tenuta, John Watson, Martin Williams, Elseworlds DC Comics, hardcover, 2001, paperback, 2003)
 DC Retroactive: Batman – The '90s #1 (2011)
 Batman/Daredevil: King of New York (Marvel-DC crossover)

Other 
 Doctor Who: "Invaders From Gantac" (with pencils by Martin Griffiths and inks by Cam Smith, in Doctor Who Magazine #148–150, 1989)
 The Last American (with co-author John Wagner and art by Mike McMahon, 4-issue mini-series, Epic Comics, 1990–1991, tpb, Com.x, 2004)
The Chronicles of Genghis Grimtoad (with co-writer John Wagner and art by Ian Gibson, in Strip (Marvel UK), 1990, collected as a Marvel Graphic Novel)
Makabre (with Enrique Alcatena. in Toxic! #7–11, 16–18, 1991)
 Buzzz (in Purnell's Book of Horror Stories, 1983)
Garbage Man (with David Pugh, in Toxic! #27–29, September–October 1991)
 The Bogie Man (with co-author John Wagner and art by Robin Smith):
 The Bogie Man (John Brown Publishing, 128 pages, 1991)
 Chinatoon (Toxic! #2–9, 1991, started by Cam Kennedy, redrawn and completed by Smith, Atomeka Press, 112 pages, 1993)
 The Manhattan Project (Toxic! #11–21, 1991, Tundra Publishing, 52 pages, 1992)
 The Bogie Man (collects the first volume and Chinatoon, Pocket Books, 224 pages, 1998)
 "Return to Casablanca" (Judge Dredd Megazine #227–233, 2005)
Psychonauts (with co-author Tony Luke (#3) and artist Motofumi Kobayashi, 4-issue mini series, Epic Comics, 1993–1994)
 Jeremiah Harm (with co-author Keith Giffen and art by Rafael Albuquerque and Rael Lyra, 5-issue mini-series, Boom! Studios, trade paperback, 128 pages, August 2007) 
 Lego Rock Raiders: High Adventure, Deep Underground (with art by Robin Smith, 48 page graphic novel, Lego Systems Incorporated, 2000)
 The Dead: Kingdom of Flies #1-4 (with art by Simon Bisley, Berserker Comics, 2008-2009)
 Church of Hell #1-2 (with Wayne Nichols and Simon Bisley, Berserker Comics, 2009)

TV and film 
As well as adaptations of his work, both official (Bogie Man) and unofficial (The Lobo Paramilitary Christmas Special) he has also written directly for film and television:

 Archangel Thunderbird (1998)
 Ace Lightning (2002)
 Dominator:
 Dominator (2003)
 Dominator X (2007)
 Action Man: Robot ATAK (2004)

Notes

External links 
 
 
 Alan Grant at Barney  
 

 
Bibliographies of British writers
Bibliographies by writer
Lists of comics by creator